Lemur tyrosine kinase 3 is a protein that in humans is encoded by the LMTK3 gene.

References

Further reading